Chukwuma is a Nigerian name that may refer to 'God knows'. It is an Igbo word. 

Given name
Chukwuma Akabueze (born 1989), Nigerian football player
Chukwuma Azikiwe (1940–2015), Nigerian diplomat and politician
Chukwuma Kaduna Nzeogwu (1937–1967), Nigerian military officer
Chukwuma Okorafor (born 1997), American football player

Surname
Chrys Chukwuma (born 1978), American football running back 
Chukwudi Chukwuma (born 1994), Nigerian football player 
Clifford Chukwuma, Nigerian football coach and former player 
Charles Chukwuma Soludo (born 1960), Nigerian economist 
Ernest Jeremiah Chukwuma (born 1985), Nigerian football player